Taylor Gibson (born June 7, 1990) is a professional wrestler known as Effy. He is known for his career on the independent circuit, most notably Game Changer Wrestling, where he also promotes the Effy's Big Gay Brunch events.

Personal life 
Tayler Gibson was raised in a very religious environment; two of his grandparents were preachers. Gibson is openly gay and is known for his support to the LGBTQ Community. He said that, due to his sexual orientation, he lost several bookings.

Professional wrestling career 
On August 30, 2019, Effy faced Nick Gage for the GCW World Championship in a Deathmatch. Despite losing the match, he would become a regular performer for the Game Changer Wrestling promotion. On October 2, 2021, Effy defeated Matt Cardona to win the Internet Championship.

On October 10, 2020, Gibson hosted Effy's Big Gay Brunch, the first of a series of shows featuring LGBTQ performers and allies. On April 10, 2021, he hosted Effy's Big Gay Brunch 2.

Professional wrestling style and persona 
Gibson described the Effy character as an over the top version of himself. Since he began to work in a religious and Republican part of the United States, he performed the "most gay version of myself" to get heat. He is nicknamed "The Weapon of Sass Destruction".

Championships and accomplishments
All-Star Wrestling Network
AWN Heritage Championship (1 time)
Atlanta Wrestling Entertainment
AWE Tag Team Championship (1 time, current) - with Ashton Starr
Destiny Christian Championship Wrestling
DCCW Championship (1 time)
Elev8  Pro
Elev8 Pro Championship (1 time)
FEST Wrestling 
FEST Wrestling Championship (2 times)
Freelance Wrestling
Freelance Legacy Championship (1 time)
Game Changer Wrestling
GCW Tag Team Championship (1 time) - with Allie Katch 
Inspire Pro Wrestling
Inspire Pro Pure Prestige Championship (1 time)
NWA Southeastern Wrestling
SWA Southeastern Heavyweight Championship (1 time)
NWA Deep South Heavyweight Championship (1 time)
Party Hard Wrestling
PHW Charizona State Championship (1 time)
Prime Time Pro Wrestling 
PTPW 51st State Championship (1 time)
Invitational Grand Prix Tournament Of Tournaments Classic International (2020)
Pro Wrestling Illustrated
Ranked No. 77 of the top 500 singles wrestlers in the PWI 500 in 2020
Other titles
Internet Championship (1 time)

References

External links 
 

American male professional wrestlers
People from Tallahassee, Florida
Professional wrestlers from Florida
Living people
LGBT professional wrestlers
1990 births
21st-century professional wrestlers